Mount Fisek is the peak rising to 1623 m in the central portion of Bastien Range in Ellsworth Mountains, Antarctica.  The feature has steep and partly ice-free north, east and southwest slopes, and surmounts Nimitz Glacier to the northeast.

The peak is named after Fisek Hill in Northeastern Bulgaria.

Location
US mapping in 1961 and 1988.

See also
 Mountains in Antarctica

Maps
 Vinson Massif.  Scale 1:250 000 topographic map.  Reston, Virginia: US Geological Survey, 1988.
 Antarctic Digital Database (ADD). Scale 1:250000 topographic map of Antarctica. Scientific Committee on Antarctic Research (SCAR). Since 1993, regularly updated.

Notes

External links
 Mount Fisek. SCAR Composite Gazetteer of Antarctica.
 Bulgarian Antarctic Gazetteer. Antarctic Place-names Commission. (details in Bulgarian, basic data in English)
 Mount Fisek. Copernix satellite image

Ellsworth Mountains
Bulgaria and the Antarctic
Mountains of Ellsworth Land